Dorow is a surname. Notable people with the surname include:

 Al Dorow (1929–2009), American gridiron football quarterback
 Dorothy Dorow (1930–2017), English operatic soprano
 Jan-Lucas Dorow (born 1993), German footballer 
 Ryan Dorow (born 1995), American professional baseball infielder 
 Tracey Dorow, American basketball coach